Miss International 1995, the 35th Miss International pageant, was held on September 10, 1995 at the Shinjuku Pension Hall, Koseinenkin Kaikan in Tokyo, Japan. 47 contestants competed for the coveted title. Christina Lekka of Greece crowned Anne Lena Hansen of Norway as the new titleholder. This marked the second time that Norway won the Miss International crown.

Results

Placements

Contestants

  - Lorena Andrea Palacios
  - Yolanda Janssen
  - Kristen Szypica
  - Berenice De Bondt
  - Liliana Arce Angulo
  - Débora Reis Moretto
  - Melanie Abdoun
  - Iovana Soraya Grisales Castañeda
  - Eleni Chrysostomou
  - Renata Hornofova
  - Sabine Sørensen
  - Cándida Lara Betances
  - Natalia Díaz
  - Rejieli Ratu
  - Mélody Vilbert
  - Katja Honak
  - Maria Pavli
  - Marie Angelique Penrose
  - Indira Lili Chinchilla Paz
  - Yula Kim
  - Nathalie van den Dungen
  - Sayda Umaña López
  - Juliana Lo Yuen-Yan
  - Lovísa Aðalheiður Guðmundsdóttir
  - Priya Gill
  - Michal Shtibel
  - Yuka Kondo
  - Lee Yoo-ree
  - Paola Roberto
  - Roxanne Sammut
  - Marlena de la Garza
  - Elaine Tudela
  - Anne Lena Hansen
  - Lorena Hernández Montero
  - Patricia Viviana Galindo Cabral
  - Gladys Andre Dinsay Dueñas
  - Patrícia Trigo
  - María del Rocío Arroyo Rivera
  - Josianne Dorby
  - Lynette Lee
  - Jana Sluková
  - Jimena Garay
  - Aranyaporn Jatupornphan
  - Ahu Paşakay
  - Krista Loskota
  - Ana María Amorer Guerrero
  - Trương Quỳnh Mai

Did not compete

  - Dianne Conolly
  - Paola Farias Alvarez
  - Carmen Mäkinen
  - Nataliya Kolumbet

External links
 Pageantopolis - Miss International 1995

1995
1995 in Tokyo
1995 beauty pageants
Beauty pageants in Japan